Albert Kwok, with the full name Albert Kwok Fen Nam (born 1921 in Kuching, Sarawak; died on 21 January 1944 in Petagas, Putatan, Sabah) was a leader of a resistance fighter known as the "Kinabalu Guerrillas" during the Japanese occupation of Borneo. He is regarded as the initiator of the so-called "Double Tenth Revolt" from 10 October 1943.

Early life 
Albert Kwok was born in 1921 in Kuching, Sarawak. His father was a dentist. In the late 1930s, he lived temporarily in China, where he learned the methods of the traditional Chinese medicine. He practised in Nanking, Hankow and Canton while serving under the Kuomintang of Chiang Kai-shek. Another source said that Kwok earned medical skills to treat haemorrhoids in Penang Straits Settlements. He returned to Borneo in 1940.

A 19-year-old Kwok moved to Jesselton on 15 May 1941 as a doctor to work. His practice was very successful although he had to treat his patients with a limited supply as the stock of drugs began to decline in the beginning years of World War II. His decision to defend himself against the occupying forces become more clear when the Japanese circulated a decree on 13 June 1942 with the following text:

Struggle for liberation

Foundation of the "Kinabalu Guerrillas" 
When the Japanese arrived to Jesselton in 1943, a close friend of Kwok who is a Chinese businessman known as Lim Keng Fatt already in contact with the liaison of the Philippine guerrillas, an Imam from Sulu by the name of Marajukim. Kwok travelled with the Imam to Sulu and learned the activities of the resistance movement under the command of Filipino Lieutenant Colonel Alejandro Suarez there.

In May 1943, Kwok returned to Jesselton with a high determination to liberate North Borneo. Once he arrived there, he first contacted the "Oversea Chinese Defence Association", with whose help he acquired medical equipment and cash donations for the support of the resistance in Sulu. Once again, in June 1943, he travelled with Imam Marajukim to the Philippines. Through the mediation of Suarez, he met with the representatives of the US army and was appointed Lieutenant on 1 July 1943.

Back in North Borneo, he started from 21 September 1943 with the creation of a separate group of resistance fighters under his leadership. He called the movement under the name of the "Kinabalu Guerrillas" or also known as the "Kinabalu Guerrillas Defence Force".

The senior management of his resistance group consisted of:
 Hiew Syn Yong – An Assistant District Officer; he took command on the Jesselton town
 Charles Peter – Formerly a senior police officer in Jesselton; he took over together with Subedar Dewa Singh, a former colleague from the police service, also took the command in Jesselton
 Kong Tze Phui – Commanded the Menggatal area
 Jules Stephens – An aide for the overall organisation responsibility

"Double Tenth Revolt" 

While Kwok is tasked to further develop his resistance group, he managed to know the plans of the Japanese-based from intelligence gatherings; according to which 2,000 young Chinese men would be forced to military service by the Japanese army, along with young Chinese women who will be used for the Japanese army comfort women. Kwok at the time only has about 100 guerrilla fighters for his resistance group, and could, moreover, expect a further 200 fighters from various indigenous ethnic groups of North Borneo.

On the eve of 10 October 1943 prior to the Chinese National Day, Kwok decide to begin their attack called as the "Double Tenth Revolt" with an estimate of 300 guerrilla fighters. The attack resulting to more than 60 Japanese troops been killed mainly by parang, bujak and kris attack. Following the success, Kwok managed to temporarily take over control of Tuaran, Menggatal and Jesselton. However, as the guerrillas were ill-equipped, three days later, the reinforcement of the Japanese troops from Kuching arrived and forced them to retreat into the hills of Menggatal. Fighting continued for more than two-months with the Japanese finally decide to change their tactic by threatening to execute 400 civilians in Shantung Valley if the group did not surrender.

Death

Execution in Petagas 
Kwok along with several of the movement leaders decide to surrender and were detained by the Japanese shortly afterward. He was first moved to a prison in Batu Tiga and then, along with 175 others who for the most part had nothing to do with the uprising are subjected to execution order by the Japanese on 21 January 1944 in Petagas. Kwok together with four other leaders – Charles Peter, Tsen Tsau Kong, Kong Tze Phui, Li Tet Phui – were executed with a beheading by katana, while the others were killed using machine guns or bayonets.

Acknowledgement 

The "Petagas War Memorial" in Putatan was then built as a memorial for Albert Kwok along with other innocent victims of Japanese executions.

References

Bibliography 
 K. G. Tregonning: "A History Of Modern Sabah (North Borneo 1881-1963)", 2. Edition, University of Malaya Press, Kuala Lumpur, 1965, Reprint 1967
 Maxwell Hall: "The Kinabalu Guerrillas", Kuching 1949, Reprint 1963
 Stephen R. Evans: "Sabah Under The Rising Sun Government, Malaysia, 1999
 F. G. Whelan: "Stories from Sabah History", Heinemann Educational Books, Hong Kong, 1968
 Paul H. Kratoska: "Southeast Asian Minorities in the Wartime Japanese Empire", Routledge, 2002, 
 Danny Wong Tze Ken: "Historical Sabah: The war", Opus Publications, Kota Kinabalu, 2010, 

1921 births
1944 deaths
People from Kuching
People executed by Japan by decapitation
People executed by Japanese occupation forces
World War II resistance members